The 2001 CAA men's basketball tournament was held March 3–5, 2001, at the Richmond Coliseum in Richmond, Virginia. The winner of the tournament was George Mason, who received an automatic bid to the 2001 NCAA Men's Division I Basketball Tournament. Richmond, East Carolina, and American were not permitted by the Colonial Athletic Association to participate in the 2001 conference tournament as penalty for leaving the CAA to join the Atlantic 10 Conference, Conference USA, and the Patriot League, respectively, at the end of the 2000–2001 season.

Bracket

Honors

References

Tournament
Colonial Athletic Association men's basketball tournament
CAA men's basketball tournament
CAA men's basketball tournament
Sports competitions in Virginia
Basketball in Virginia